Augusto Franqui was a Cuban baseball pitcher and outfielder in the Cuban League. He played with Carmelita and Habana in 1904, Eminencia in 1905, and Rojo in 1906.

References

External links

Year of birth missing
Cuban League players
Cuban baseball players
Carmelita players
Eminencia players
Habana players
Year of death unknown